Eugene Borgida is an American social and political psychologist.

Borgida graduated from Wesleyan University in 1971, and earned his doctorate at the University of Michigan in 1976. Upon completing his Ph.D., Borgida began teaching at the University of Minnesota, where he was appointed Morse-Alumni Distinguished Professor of Psychology in 1996, and served as Fesler-Lampert Chair in Urban and Regional Affairs between 2002 and 2003.  Borgida is a fellow of the American Psychological Association, Association for Psychological Science and American Association for the Advancement of Science.

References

External links
Faculty page

American political psychologists
Fellows of the American Association for the Advancement of Science
Fellows of the Association for Psychological Science
University of Minnesota faculty
University of Michigan alumni
Wesleyan University alumni
20th-century American psychologists
21st-century American psychologists
Living people
Year of birth missing (living people)